A social entrepreneur is an entrepreneur who works to increase social capital by founding social ventures, including charities, for-profit businesses with social causes, and other non-government organizations. These types of activities are distinct from work of non-operating foundations and philanthropists who provide funding and other support for them.

Notable historical social entrepreneurs

Notable modern social entrepreneurs

References

 
Lists of people by occupation
Lists of businesspeople